A public university or public college is a university or college that is in owned by the state or receives significant public funds through a national or subnational government, as opposed to a private university. Whether a national university is considered public varies from one country (or region) to another, largely depending on the specific education landscape.

Africa

Egypt 

In Egypt, Al-Azhar University was founded in 970 AD as a madrasa; it formally became a public university in 1961 and is one of the oldest institutions of higher education in the world. In the 20th century, Egypt opened many other public universities with government-subsidized tuition fees, including Cairo University in 1908, Alexandria University in 1912, Assiut University in 1928, Ain Shams University in 1957, Helwan University in 1959, Beni-Suef University in 1963, Zagazig University in 1974, Benha University in 1976, and Suez Canal University in 1989.

Kenya

In Kenya, the Ministry of Education controls all public universities. Students enroll after completing a 8-4-4 educational program system and attaining a mark of C+ or above. Students who meet the criteria set annually by the Kenya Universities and Colleges Central Placement Service receive government sponsorship, with the government providing part of their university or college fees. Students are also eligible for a low-interest loan from the Higher Education Loan Board; students must pay back the loan after completing their higher education.

Nigeria

In Nigeria, both the federal and state governments may establish public universities.

South Africa

South Africa has 26 public universities which are members of Universities South Africa. These are categorized as traditional or comprehensive universities.

Tunisia

In Tunisia, the Ministry of Higher Education and Scientific Research controls public universities and guarantees admission to students who earn a Tunisian Baccalaureate. Using a state website, the students make a wish list of the universities they want to attend, with the highest-ranking students getting priority choices. Universities rank students according to the results of their baccalaureate.

Asia

Bangladesh 

There are forty public universities in Bangladesh. They are overseen by the University Grants Commission which was created by the government in 1973.

Brunei

Most universities in Brunei are public.

People's Republic of China 

In the People's Republic of China, nearly all universities and research institutions are public. Typically, provincial governments run public universities. However, some are administered by municipal governments or are national, which the central government directly administers. Private undergraduate colleges exist but are primarily vocational colleges sponsored by private entities. Private universities usually cannot award bachelor's degrees. Public universities tend to enjoy a higher reputation domestically and globally.

Hong Kong 

The University Grants Committee funds eight higher education institutions in Hong Kong. The Academy for Performing Arts also receives funding from the government. The Open University of Hong Kong is a public university, but it is largely self-financed. The Shue Yan University is the only private institution with the status of a university; however, it also receives some financial support from the government.

India 

In India, most universities and nearly all research institutions are public. Some private undergraduate colleges exist but most are engineering schools that are affiliated with public universities. Private schools can be partially aided by the national or state governments. India also has an "open" public university, the Indira Gandhi National Open University which offers distance education. In terms of the number of enrolled students, is now the largest university in the world with over four million students.

Indonesia 

In Indonesia, the government supports public universities in each province. Funding comes through the Ministry of Education, Culture, Research, and Technology and the provincial and municipal governments.

Iran

Some of the public universities in Iran offer tuition-free and tuition-based programs. State-run universities are highly selective and competitive.

Israel

There are nine official universities in Israel, a few dozen colleges, and about a dozen foreign university extensions. The Council for Higher Education in Israel  supervises all of these institutions academically. Only a university, not a college, can issue doctorate degrees in Israel.

Japan 

In Japan, public universities are run by local governments, either prefectural or municipal. According to the Ministry of Education, public universities have "provided an opportunity for higher education in a region and served the central role of intellectual and cultural base for the local community in the region" and are "expected to contribute to social, economical and cultural development in the region". This contrasts with the research-oriented aspects of national universities.

In 2010, 127,872 students were attending 95 public universities, compared to 86 national universities and 597 private universities in Japan. Many public universities are relatively new; in 1980, there were only 34 public universities in Japan. Since July 2003, public universities may incorporate under the Local Independent Administrative Institutions Law.

Kyrgyzstan

Manas University in Kyrgyzstan is a public higher education institution that offers associate degrees, undergraduate degrees, and graduate and postgraduate degrees.

Macau

University of Macau and Macao Polytechnic University are the public universities in Macau. In addition, the Macao Institute for Tourism Studies is a public higher education institution that offers undergraduate and postgraduate education.

Malaysia 

There are twenty public universities in Malaysia, funded by the government but governed as self-managed institutions.

Nepal 

Tribhuvan University was the first public university in Nepal. It operates through six different schools and is affiliated with various colleges. The Pokhara University Act of 1997 established the government-funded Pokhara University. Although financed by the Nepalese government, Pokhara University is a non-profit autonomous institution, which affiliates with 58 colleges for bachelor's, master's, and M.Phil. degree programs.

Pakistan 

There are 107 public universities in Pakistan, compared to 76 private universities. University of the Punjab is the biggest public university, followed by University of Karachi. The public universities receive guidance and recognition from the Higher Education Commission.

Philippines 

There are more than 500 public higher education institutions in the Philippines that are controlled and managed by the Commission on Higher Education. Of the 500, 436 are state colleges and universities, 31 local colleges and universities, and a handful of community colleges. In 2008, the Philippine Congress passed Republic Act 9500, declaring the University of the Philippines as the national university to distinguish it from all other state universities and colleges. Other notable public colleges and universities include the Polytechnic University of the Philippines, Technological University of the Philippines, Philippine Normal University, Batangas State University, and Mindanao State University.

Singapore 
There are six autonomous public universities in Singapore, including National University of Singapore founded in 1905, Nanyang Technological University founded 1981, Singapore Management University founded in 2000, Singapore University of Technology and Design and Singapore Institute of Technology founded in 2009, and Singapore University of Social Sciences founded in 2017.

South Korea 

In South Korea, most public universities are national. There are 29 national universities, eighteen special universities, and ten educational universities. In addition, there are two national colleges and the Korea National Open University which offers distance learning. The University of Seoul is a public municipal university.

Sri Lanka 

In Sri Lanka, there are seventeen public universities. Most public universities are funded by the government through the University Grants Commission, which handles undergraduate placements and staff appointments. The top institutions include the University of Peradeniya founded in 1942 and the University of Colombo founded in 1921. Sri Lanka also has a joint service military university, the General Sir John Kotelawala Defence University, which is operated by the Ministry of Defence.

Taiwan 

One-third of the 150 universities in Taiwan are public. Because the Taiwanese government provides funding to public universities, their students pay less than half of the tuition fees than half those of private universities. Ten public universities were established before the 1980s and are the most prestigious in Taiwan. As a result, most students choose public universities for their tertiary education.

Thailand 

In the late 19th century Thailand, there was a high demand for professional talent by the central government. In 1899, the King founded the School for Training of Civil Officials near the northern gate of the royal palace. Graduates from the school became royal pages, a traditional entrance into the Mahattai Ministry or other government ministries. As of 2019, Thailand has nineteen public universities.

Vietnam

Europe

Austria

In Austria, most universities are public. The state regulates tuition fees, making costs the same for all public universities. Except for some fields of study, notably medicine, all Austrians who pass the Matura exam have the right to attend any public university. Overenrolled degree programs have introduced additional entrance exams that students must pass in the first year or before starting the degree, especially with scientific subjects such as biology, chemistry, and physics. Private universities have existed since 1999 but are considered easier than public universities and thus hold less esteem.

Belgium 

All public universities in Belgium were operated under the legislation of the national government until higher education was moved to the control of the three communities in 1990. Consequently, the Flemish, the French, and the German communities determine which institutes of higher education organize and issue diplomas.

Until the 1970s, Belgium had two state universities: the University of Liège (ULiège) and the Ghent University (UGent), both founded in 1817. These are often referred to as the two historic state universities. In 1965, small specialized single-faculty public institutions were recognized as universities, including the Faculty of Veterinary Medicine and the Gembloux Agro-Bio Tech; both are now part of the University of Liège.

The Belgian state created smaller public universities that have since merged with larger institutions, including the public university at Mons in 1965 which became part of the University of Mons in 2009. The state-created university founded in Antwerp in 1971 is now part of University of Antwerp. Hasselt University started as a state-created public institution managed by the Province of Limburg. Similarly, the Province of Luxembourg managed the state-created public university in Arlon which became part of ULiège in 2004.

Since 1891, private universities have gradually become state-recognized and funded. Some private, mostly Catholic, organizations are called free institutions, as in administratively free from the state despite being state-funded. As of 2022, the communities fund all recognized universities, public and private, which follow the same rules and laws.

Croatia

The state runs most public universities in Croatia. Students who perform well academically pay only administrative fees which are less than €100 per year. Students who fail multiple classes in a year must retake the courses and pay a partial or full tuition fee.

Denmark

Almost all universities in Denmark are public and are held in higher esteem than their private counterparts. Danish students attend university for free.

Finland

All universities in Finland are public and free of charge.

France

Most universities and grandes écoles in France are public and charge very low tuition fees—less than €1000 per year. Major exceptions are business schools such as HEC School of Management. Article L731-14 of the Code de l'éducation states that "private higher education establishments can in no case take the title of university." Nevertheless, many private institutions, such as the Catholic University of Lyon, use the university as their marketing name.

Germany

Most higher education institutions in Germany are public and operated by the states. All professors are public servants. Public universities are generally held in higher esteem than their private counterparts. From 1972 through 1998, public universities were tuition-free; however, some states have since adopted low tuition fees.

Greece

According to the constitution of Greece, higher education institutions (HEI) include universities, technical universities, and specialist institutions. HEI undergraduate programs are government-funded and do not charge tuition. A quarter of HEI postgraduate programs are tuition-free. After individual assessments, thirty percent of Greek students are entitled to attend any of the statutory postgraduate programs without tuition fees. Founded as a national institution in 1926, the Academy of Athens is the highest research establishment in Greece.

Private higher education institutions cannot operate in Greece and are not recognized as degree-awarding bodies by the Greek government.

Ireland

In Ireland, nearly all universities, institutes of technology, colleges, and some third-level institutions are public. The state pays the cost of educating undergraduates, although students must contribute approximately €3,000. There are a few private institutions of higher learning, such as the National College of Ireland. However, none of the private institutions have university status and are highly specialized.

Italy

Almost all universities in Italy are public but have institutional autonomy by law. The Italian state provides the majority of university funding. Therefore, students pay relatively low tuition fees, set by each university according to the student's family wealth, the course of study, and exam performance. A few scholarships are available for the best low-income students at the undergraduate and postgraduate levels. However, for research, private funding ranges from low to non-existent, compared to most European countries.

Netherlands

The Netherlands Ministry of Education funds most public universities. Dutch citizens and those from European Union countries pay an annual tuition fee for their first bachelor's or master's degree; the fee was €1,951 in 2015. Non-European Union students and students who want to complete a second bachelor's or master's degree pay a legal school fee. Annually, these legal school fees range between €7,000 for bachelor programs and €30,000 for master's programs in medicine. The Ministry of Education supervises all universities, including private institutions.

Norway

Almost all universities in Norway are public and state-funded.

Poland

In Poland, public universities are established by Acts of Parliament. The government pays all tuition fees and other costs of public university students. In contrast, private citizens, societies, or companies operate private universities that charge tuition fees directly to students. These institutions are generally held in lower regard than public universities. A small number of private universities do not charge fees, such as John Paul II Catholic University of Lublin.

Portugal 

There are thirteen public universities, a university institute, and a distance university in Portugal. Higher education in Portugal provided by state-run institutions is not free; students must pay a tuition fee. However, the tuition fee is lower than that of private universities. The highest tuition fee allowed by law in public universities is €697 per year as of 2022. Public universities include some of the most selective and demanding higher learning institutions in Portugal.

Russia

In Russia, about 7.5 million students study in thousands of universities. Founded in 1755, Moscow State University is a public research university and the most prestigious university in Russia. Saint Petersburg State University is a state-owned university that was founded in 1724; it is managed by the government of the Russian Federation.

Serbia

In Serbia, over 85% of college students study at state-operated public universities. Academically well-performing students pay only administrative fees of less than €100 per year. Students who fail multiple classes in a year and have to retake them, pay a partial or full tuition fee, ranging from €500 to €2000 per year. Private universities have existed in Serbia since 1989 but are held in less esteem because they are generally less academically rigorous than the public universities.

Spain 

Of the 74 universities in Spain, 54 are public and funded by the autonomous community in which they are based. University funding differs by region. However, the central government establishes homogeneous tuition fees for all public universities which are much lower than those of their private counterparts. The highest tuition fee allowed by law was, as of 2010, €14.97 per academic credit, amounting to roughly €900 a year for an average 60-credit full-time course. Tuition fees at private universities might reach €18,000 a year.

Public universities are state-owned but are granted considerable independence and self-governance. However, public universities do not have free use of their assets and are subject to Spanish administrative law. Public university administrators, lecturers, and professors are granted civil servant status rather than tenure. A Spanish civil servant can only be fired under exceptional and well-justified circumstances. Research funding is allocated by the autonomous community or the central government; in the former, funding amount and conditions vary significantly from one independent community to another.

Sweden

Most universities in Sweden are public. Education in Sweden is free, so students do not pay tuition at any Swedish university.

Turkey

In 2016, there were 183 universities and academies in Turkey, including 118 state universities, five technical universities, two institutes of technology, and one fine arts university. Turkey's higher learning institutions are governed by the Ministry of Higher Education or YÖK Ministry. Of the 65 private foundation universities, seven are two-year granting institutions. In addition, there are special institutions, including four military academies and one police academy.

Ukraine

United Kingdom 

In the United Kingdom, the government does not own universities. However, universities are considered public if they receive funding for teaching or research from one of the funding councils.

The right to award degrees and use the title university or university college is granted by the Privy Council for institutions in Scotland, Wales, and Northern Ireland and by the Office for Students for institutions in England. All universities are autonomous and legally independent of the state, but are still regulated by the government. The degree of regulation varies between the countries and depends on the university's constitutional form and whether it receives public funding. Most universities in the United Kingdom receive public funding through block grants from the Office for Students (England), the Higher Education Funding Council for Wales, the Department for the Economy (Northern Ireland), or the Scottish Funding Council. There are only six fully-fledged private universities in the United Kingdom that do not receive block grants, all in England.

Universities and other higher education providers that receive block grants are treated as public authorities under the Equality Act 2010 and the Freedom of Information Act 2000 (the Freedom of Information (Scotland) Act 2002 for institutions in Scotland). They are also likely to be considered a public authority under the Human Rights Act 1998. Universities incorporated as higher education corporations are regarded as public authorities for some purposes, even if they do not receive public funding.

If a university in England receives public funding, the government regulates the tuition fees the university can charge. In addition, registration as a higher education provider is obligatory for English universities, whether or not they are publicly funded, and requires adherence to public interest governance principles. All registered providers in England must also be members of the Office of the Independent Adjudicator.

However, direct government funding for universities has declined since 2012. Between 2014 and 2018, funding council grants dropped from 18% to 15% for University College London (a large research university), 17% to 11% for Durham University (a small research university), and 15% to 8% for the University of Hertfordshire (a teaching-focused university).

Each of the four nations within the United Kingdom is responsible for higher education as a devolved matter and have adopted different methods of support for resident students. Scotland offers free tuition for residents for their first undergraduate degree in Scotland. The Welsh Government provides means-tests grants and loans to students, based on family income; the funding follows Welsh students, even if they choose to study outside of Wales. England and Northern Ireland expect students to take out student loans to cover the cost of tuition.

The University of London was government controlled from its establishment as an examining board in 1836 to its reconstitution as a more traditional teaching university in 1900. It has been described as "what today would be called a quango", operating out of government premises, staffed by civil servants, and directly accountable to the Treasury for its expenditure.

Until 2019, the governing documents of publicly funded universities could only be modified with permission from the Privy Council. For the majority of publicly funded universities in England, the Higher Education and Research Act 2017 replaced Privy Council oversight with public interest governance regulations from the Office for Students. However, Privy Council oversight continues for almost all English institutions that were in the university sector before 1992, and would continue even if they were to cease to be publicly funded, due to their constitutional form as civil corporations, statutory corporations, or as chartered corporations.

Notes

North America

Canada 

In Canada, education is a constitutional responsibility of the individual provinces. Provincial governments established the University of Toronto on the Oxbridge model and the University of Alberta and University of Manitoba in the pattern of American state universities.

Many older universities in Canada were privately endowed such as McGill University or founded by church denominations, such as Mount Allison University (United Church),Université Laval (Catholic), St Mary's University (Catholic),  Queen's University at Kingston (Presbyterian), Dalhousie University (Nonsectarian), St. Francis Xavier University (Catholic), McMaster University (Baptist), and the University of Ottawa (Catholic); these became publicly funded and secular in the 20th century. All major Canadian universities are now publicly funded but maintain institutional autonomy, with the ability to decide admission, tuition, and governance.

Costa Rica 

In Costa Rica, public universities include the University of Costa Rica, the National University, the Distance State University, National Technical University and the Costa Rica Institute of Technology.

Mexico 

Mexico has both public and private universities, with wide variation in terms of cost, academic performance, and organization. The most reputable and largest university, the National Autonomous University of Mexico (UNAM), is publicly funded and virtually free, while also independent from the government. Instituto Politécnico Nacional is a federally-administered public university. Several public state universities follow an autonomous model similar to UNAM, including Universidad de Guadalajara and Universidad Autónoma de Nuevo León. However, these state universities do not receive as much public funding, which means higher tuition fees.

Panama 
In Panama, there are five public universities, including the University of Panama and the Technological University of Panama. Public universities are state-funded with no cost or minimal tuition, around US$1,500 over four years. Public universities operate autonomously, without intervention from the state. Public universities are prestigious due to their free or low-cost nature, which removes financial incentives to pass and retain students.

United States 

In the United States, most public universities are operated by state governments and rely on subsidies from their respective states. However, support for public universities has declined in recent decades, forcing many public universities to seek private donations or raise tuition. The percentage of state appropriations per student at public universities has fallen from 78% in 1974 to 43% in 2000. States generally charge higher tuition to out-of-state students because in-state students or their parents have previously subsidized the university by paying state taxes.

The oldest public universities in the United States are the University of North Carolina at Chapel Hill, founded in 1789, and the University of Georgia, founded in 1795. The College of William & Mary, founded in 1693, and Rutgers University, founded in 1766, were two of the nine colonial colleges. Both were private universities until the 20th century, with William & Mary becoming public in 1908 and Rutgers in 1945.

Every state has at least one public university, and the largest states have more than thirty. This is partly a result of 1862 Morrill Land-Grant Acts, which gave eligible states  of federal land to sell to finance public universities that emphasized studies in agriculture and mechanical arts. The University of Wisconsin, Iowa State University, and the University of Missouri were early land-grand colleges. Targeted at the Southern states, the Agricultural College Act of 1890 required states to establish land-grant universities for African Americans if they were excluded from the state's existing land-grant institutions. The Civil Rights Act of 1964, the Higher Education Act of 1965, and the Education Amendments of 1972, made public universities even more accessible for women, minorities, and lower-income applicants.

Many U.S. public universities began as teacher training institutions, often named normal schools or teachers colleges, and eventually expanded into comprehensive universities. Examples include the University of California, Los Angeles;  Arizona State University; the University of Wisconsin–Milwaukee; and Missouri State University. There are also public tribal colleges and universities operated by Native American , and some colleges where a municipal government is an owner or part of governance such as the City University of New York and Quincy College. The only federally chartered public universities are the United States Service academies that are administered by the United States Department of Defense and the Haskell Indian Nations University, which the Bureau of Indian Affairs governs. The University of the District of Columbia is the public university in Washington, D.C., overseen by the Government of the District of Columbia under authority devolved from Congress under District of Columbia home rule.

Historically, many of the prestigious universities in the United States are private, most notably the Ivy League. However, some public universities are highly prestigious and increasingly selective; these are now referred to as a Public Ivy. For example, the University of California, Berkeley is often ranked as a top-ten university in the world and the top public university in the United States. There are a number of public liberal arts colleges, including the members of the Council of Public Liberal Arts Colleges.

Community colleges in the United States are generally public colleges. They typically offer associate's degrees for two academic years of post-secondary school. In contrast, bachelor's degrees from universities represent four academic years of post-secondary school. In the 21st century, some community colleges have added bachelor's degree programs, particularly in applied career-focused subjects.

Notes

Oceania

Australia 

Australia has 43 universities, with 37 being public universities. The Group of Eight includes some of the oldest public universities in Australia, including the University of Queensland, University of Sydney, University of Melbourne, University of New South Wales, University of Adelaide, University Western Australia, Australian National University, and Monash University.

The Australian Technology Network of public universities grew from the former Institutes of Technology and include RMIT University, Queensland University of Technology, Curtin University, the University of Technology Sydney, and the University of South Australia. These former technology institutes gained university status in the late 1980s through the early 1990s due to the reforms made by John Dawkins, then Minister for Employment, Education, and Training. Innovative Research Universities represents several public research-intensive institutions, with most members being established in the 1960s and 1970s. The group includes Charles Darwin University, James Cook University, Griffith University, La Trobe University, Flinders University, Murdoch University, and Western Sydney University.

The Regional Universities Network includes seven regional Australian public universities, including Central Queensland University, Southern Cross University, Federation University, the University of Southern Queensland, the University of the Sunshine Coast, University of New England (Australia), and Charles Sturt University. The NUW Alliance consists of three public universities in New South Wales: University of Newcastle, University of New South Wales, and University of Wollongong.

New Zealand 

In New Zealand, all eight universities are public. The University of Otago is the oldest and was established in 1869 by Provincial Ordinance. From 1870 to 1961, the University of New Zealand was effectively a single university structure with constituent colleges located in Auckland, Wellington, Christchurch, and Dunedin. In 1961,  the New Zealand Parliament dissolved the constituent colleges to form four independent universities: University of Auckland, Victoria University of Wellington, University of Canterbury, and University of Otago. This change also established a new university in Hamilton, the University of Waikato.

Two former agricultural colleges, Massey University and Lincoln University, became universities in 1963 and 1990, respectively. Auckland University of Technology was established in 2000 by an Order in Council under the Education Act 1989.

South America

Argentina 
In Argentina, the national universities, also called public or state-run universities, were created by a National Congress Act. The exception is universities that predate the state, such as the National University of Córdoba and the University of Buenos Aires that are public law legal entities. The Argentinian government sets funding for public universities through the annual national budget act.

National universities are located in all provinces and serve over eighty percent of the country's undergraduate population. These universities are tuition-free for students, as is access to books in the universities' libraries. Students typically purchase course books and studying materials; scholarships are available for low-income students.

Argentina's national universities account for over fifty percent of the country's scientific research and provide technical assistance to the public and private sectors.

Brazil 

In Brazil, the federal or state governments fund a few hundred public universities, including the University of São Paulo, the University of Campinas, the Federal University of Rio Grande do Sul, the Federal University of Rio de Janeiro, the Federal University of Minas Gerais, the Federal University of Bahia, and the Federal Institutes.

The Brazilian Federal Constitution establishes the right to attend public universities free of tuition or entrance fees. Because public universities have thousands of applicants annually, only the best students can pass the entrance examinations. The examinations are either vestibular (specific to the university) or the country-wide ENEM. Since 2005, the Brazilian government has offered some tuition grants to enable students experiencing poverty to attend private universities.

At many public universities, there are quotas of around fifty percent for students whose secondary (high school) education was entirely in a public-funded school. Public universities also have racial quotas, usually restricted to students from public high schools. Some universities give extra points on their admission tests instead of using a quota system. For example, at the Federal University of Minas Gerais, public high school students are granted a 10% bonus over their test grade, and public school students who declare themselves black or pardo (mixed-race) receive a 15% bonus.

Public universities are responsible for granting nearly all the graduate degrees in Brazil, including doctorates and masters which are called doutorado and mestrado, respectively. Professors at public universities are public servants, tenured and hired through public application, with international research publications being a significant criterion. A public university professor's teaching load is usually modest and leaves time for research. As a result, public university graduate programs are the primary source of Brazilian academic research.

In contrast, most private institutions are for-profit enterprises that hire teachers on an hourly basis and conduct comparatively little research; notable exceptions are a few private but non-profit universities affiliated with religious organizations, such as the Mackenzie Presbyterian University of São Paulo and the Pontifical Catholic University of Rio de Janeiro.

Chile 

In Chile, state-run universities are less expensive than private ones but are not tuition-free. Chile spends only four percent of its GDP on education, compared to the 7% recommended by the United Nations for developed nations. As a result, students and their families must cover 75 percent of tuition costs for attending both public and private universities.

The most prestigious universities are the state-run Universidad de Chile and the private with state funding Pontificia Universidad Católica de Chile, Universidad de Concepción, and Universidad Técnica Federico Santa María. The Universidad de Chile is the country's leading research institution.

Peru 

Historically, many of the prestigious universities in Peru have been public, including the National University of San Marcos. Founded in May 1551, it is the top university in Peru and the oldest university in the Americas. To be admitted into one of the national public universities, students much have a high score on the admission test.

In 2002, the most prestigious public universities joined and created the Strategic Alliance of Peruvian Universities, including National University of San Marcos, La Molina - National Agrarian University, National University of Engineering, Federico Villarreal University, and the National University of Callao. Other public and private universities joined as an associate or advisory members.

See also 
Private university
State university system
National university
Prefectural university

Footnotes

References

External links
 

Types of university or college